Marie-Chantal Croft (born c. 1969) is an architect in Quebec, Canada. She teaches architectural design at the School of Architecture of Laval University.

Biography

She graduated from  Laval University in 1992.
She was a co-founder of the firm "Croft Pelletier" architectes in 1995 together with Patkau Architects. "Croft Pelletier" architectes designed the Grande Bibliothèque in Montreal. The firm also won the competition to design a major expansion to the bibliothèque de Charlesbourg in Quebec City and received the Henry Adams Certificate of the American Institute of Architecture.

Awards

References

External links 
 Profile at Coarchitecture (archived copy, in French)
“Marie-Chantal Croft, Architecte Senior Principale, MOAQ, Mirac, Responsable Architecture, Culture Et Collectivités.” Écobâtiment, https://www.ecobatiment.org/equipe/marie-chantal-croft-architecte-senior-principale-9/
Chassé-Dumont, Justine. “Marie-Chantal Croft : " Une Architecture Responsable, C'est Valoriser Ce Qui Est Déjà Existant ".” Index, https://www.index-design.ca/article/marie-chantal-croft-une-architecture-responsable-c-est-valoriser-ce-qui-est-deja-existant
Vallerand, Olivier. “Stage Jewel: Le Diamant Theatre, Quebec City, Quebec.” Canadian Architect, 26 Oct. 2020, https://www.canadianarchitect.com/stage-jewel-le-diamant-theatre-quebec-city-quebec/

Canadian women architects
People from Quebec City
Université Laval alumni
Academic staff of Université Laval
Architecture educators
French Quebecers